Justice Finch may refer to:

Edward R. Finch (1873–1965), justice of the New York Supreme Court, and an associate justice of the New York Court of Appeals
Francis Miles Finch (1827–1907), associate justice of the New York Court of Appeals
James A. Finch Jr. (1907–1988), associate justice of the Missouri Supreme Court